The Renwu Refuse Incineration Plant is an incinerator in Renwu District, Kaohsiung, Taiwan.

History
The construction of the plant was completed in February 2000 led by Mitsubishi Heavy Industries and CTCI Corporation. In December 2012, the plant implemented a computerized maintenance management system. The project started in January 2013 and went online in September later that year.

Technical details
The plant can treat 1,350 tons of garbage per day and produce 809 MWh of electricity per day. Its operation is run by Swire SITA Waste Services. As of 2020, it received a total of 35,430 tons of garbage annually and incinerated 36,887 tons of them.

See also
 Air pollution in Taiwan
 Waste management in Taiwan

References

2000 establishments in Taiwan
Incinerators in Kaohsiung
Infrastructure completed in 2000
Renwu District